Derek Ugochukwu  (born 7 June 1991) is a Nigerian writer, director and actor. He studied at Dun Laoghaire Institute Of Art Design and Technology in Dublin.

Early life and education
Ugochukwu was born in Port-Harcourt, Rivers State. He is the third of six children raised in an Igbo Catholic family. He graduated with a 1st class master's degree in Screenwriting for Film & Television at Dún Laoghaire Institute of Art, Design and Technology (IADT). He also holds a master's degree in international management and global business awarded by the University of Limerick in 2014, making him a double master's holder.

Career
His early work includes roles in multiple short films and in 2018, he landed the role of 'Father Okocha' in "Honest" premiering at the 2018 Galway Film Fleadh. In the same year, he took part in the Mill Theatre production Of Mice and Men as 'Crooks' and subsequently landed the role of 'Abu Al Jabar' in the 2020 Crime Drama Series Cold Courage  based on a book by Finnish author Pekka Hiltunen.

In May 2020, Screen Ireland announced Ugochukwu as one of the successful 15 writers selected from a pool of 195 applicants for its inaugural Spotlight development scheme aimed at fostering new and diverse writing talent. In January 2021, Ugochukwu was one of the successful 10 writers shortlisted from over 600 entries for the Virgin Media Discovers short film competition in partnership with Screen Ireland. ENGINE Shorts which aims to inspire and support up-and-coming writers, directors and producers in Limerick, Tipperary and Clare, announced Ugochukwu as one of the six winning directors selected to create inspiring, engaging world-class short films that resonate with a wide international audience.

To All My Darlings, a short film written by Ugochukwu, and starring Demi Isaac Oviawe, was shortlisted for the 2021 BAFTA Student Film Awards. It also won the Audience Award for Best Short at the 2021 Dublin International Film Festival. His directorial short film, You're Not Home, was nominated for an IFTA for Best Live-Action Short, screening at various prestigious international film festivals including Sitges Film Festival and SXSW.

Filmography

As actor

Theatre

As filmmaker

Awards and nominations

References

External links

Living people
21st-century Nigerian male actors
Alumni of IADT
Black Irish people
Nigerian male film actors
Nigerian male stage actors
Irish people of Nigerian descent
1991 births
Igbo people
Nigerian film award winners